The Most Fun You Can Have Dying is a 2012 New Zealand romantic drama film directed by Kirstin Marcon and starring Matt Whelan, Roxane Mesquida and Pana Hema Taylor. The film is based on the novel Seraphim Blues written by Steven Gannaway.

The film follows Michael, a university student who on being told he has only a few months to live decides to take his life into his own hands and enjoy every minute he has left.
It was a nominee for Best Film at the 2012 Sorta Unofficial New Zealand Film Awards.

Plot 

The story begins in Hamilton, New Zealands fourth largest city where Michael (Matt Whelan) lives in a run down student flat with his best friend David (Pana Hema Taylor). Michael has been having medical tests and is given the shattering news that he has terminal liver cancer. Michael reacts by drinking excessively and hiding the news from his friends. Through the support Michael is offered by his friends, especially David, he begins to accept his prognosis. It is revealed via photographs that Michael's mother also died from cancer.

The community of Cambridge, a small town where Michael grew up raise $200,000 in an attempt to save his life through a revolutionary medical programme in the United States. However, Michael is concerned about the side effects of the programme and the fact that it only has a 10% chance of working.

In a moment of honesty Michael confesses to David that he had a one-night stand with David's girlfriend. David is furious and storms off leaving Michael to his thoughts. Michael then makes the decision to leave New Zealand and see the world during his final few months.
Without telling anyone Michael manages to scam the $200,000 and flees New Zealand stopping off in Hong Kong en route to London. Michael then descends into a hedonistic lifestyle drinking and spending his nights in seedy nightclubs. One night Michael hits on a woman only to have her boyfriend violently attack him. Bleeding and bruised Michael is awoken in alley by Sylvie (Roxanne Mesquida) and invites her for a coffee. When she asks "where?" he replies "how about Paris?".

Michael and Sylvie then begin to travel a snow swept Europe taking in the sights in Paris, Munich, and Berlin. Initially the mysterious Sylvie rejects Michaels romantic overtures but after a short time they become lovers. Michael is rapidly becoming  unwell and Sylvie confronts him about his illness. An emotional Sylvie reacts by picking up another man only to be discovered by Michael having sex with him. Michael is distraught and packs his bags to leave only to calm down and eventually forgive Sylvie.

Sylvie is clearly troubled and we discover that she has suffered a miscarriage,  the father being someone she had known sometime before Michael. Whilst travelling across Germany in a car Sylvie and Michael start playfighting, Sylvie then takes the wheel and unexpectedly wrenches the wheel causing them to deliberately crash.

Michael awakes in a German hospital to find Sylvie is dead and that he is to be arrested for fraud for his theft in New Zealand. He is also under suspicion for having caused the death of Sylvie. Michael is grief-stricken at Sylvie's death and later awakes  to find David next to him who has flown from New Zealand to take him home. A sympathetic German doctor refuses to let the police arrest Michael and hints that he has to the morning to escape.

A seriously ill Michael and David flee the hospital and agree to one final session of partying before returning to New Zealand.
Michael and David travel to Monaco and dress up formally to gamble in a casino. Michael persuades David to risk all their money on the roulette table and they end up winning hundreds of thousands of Euros. They return to their hotel with the intention of returning to New Zealand the next day. A critically ill Michael instead sneaks out of the hotel, leaving behind a note for the sleeping David and his father and travels to Venice.

In Venice Michael stares lovingly at a photo of his mother - taken in the same spot in Venice, and takes an overdose of his cancer drugs, washed down with copious amounts of wine. Michael dies looking out on a stunning Venice, leaving this world on his own terms.

Cast 
 Matt Whelan as Michael
 Roxane Mesquida as Sylvie
 Pana Hema Taylor as David
 Colin Moy as John
 Clementine Howe as Lizzy
 Caren Pistorius as Chloe
 Sophie Henderson as Tina
 Matthew J. Saville as Dr. Lake
 Arlo MacDiarmid as Jeff

Reception 

Lydia Jenkin in the New Zealand Herald wrote that "..this is one of the most memorable local films to emerge in a long time, with beautiful icy cold cinematography and characters of gravity and realism, but it's not one for the faint-hearted".

Helen Martin wrote that the film was "...really striking, a great looking film, nicely edited, with beautifully composed and lit visuals (Europe in winter looks magical) and excellent production design".

Graeme Tuckett wrote that "..the film is a road trip, of sorts, a fantasy of youth and waste, and at times a thoughtful and quite incisive existential sketch of what it's like to hate yourself, when everyone around you thinks you're actually just fine".

The film was nominated as Best Picture at the 2012 New Zealand Film Awards losing out to the Orator.

The Most Fun Dying won 'best cinematography' and 'best production design' at the 2012 New Zealand Film awards
https://en.wikipedia.org/wiki/2012_Sorta_Unofficial_New_Zealand_Film_Awards

Soundtrack 

The soundtrack of the film was released in 2012 by Flying Nun records.

References 

2012 films
New Zealand romantic drama films
2010s English-language films